Tokunbo Olugbala Olajide (born December 5, 1976 in Vancouver, British Columbia) is a Canadian retired Light Middleweight boxer. He is of Nigerian descent.

He has a record of 20 wins with 17 knockouts and only 2 losses.

His brother is former Super Middleweight boxer Michael Olajide.

Professional boxing record

External links
 

1976 births
Living people
Boxers from New York City
American people of Nigerian descent
American people of Yoruba descent
Canadian male boxers
Yoruba sportspeople
Sportspeople from Vancouver
Black Canadian boxers
Canadian expatriate sportspeople in the United States
American male boxers
Light-middleweight boxers